Richard Tuwangye (born 16 October 1980) is a Ugandan actor, comedian,  and musician. He is a founding member of Fun Factory Uganda.

Early life and education 
Richard Tuwangye was born 16 October 1980 to Enock Tuwangye and Hope Tuwangye in Masaka, Uganda. In 1987 he began his primary school in Molly and Paul Primary School. It was here that he started acting as early as Primary One, in a school drama. In his Primary Five, he changed school to Bwara Primary School where he completed his Primary Leaving Examinations in 1993. He later joined St. Henry's College Kitovu where he sat for Uganda Certificate of Education in 1997. He then joined Kako Senior Secondary School for his A-level where he sat his Uganda Advanced Certificate of Education. From here, he was admitted to Makerere University at the School of Performing Arts where he graduated in Bachelor of Arts in Drama in 2004.

Career

Music 
In 2004 Richard, Meddie and Isaac formed the VIP Modern Dance Troupe which he headed.

In 2005, wrote and sang Can't Live Without you produced by Fenon Records. The VIP Modern Dance Troupe afterwards turned into a music group and later on released Tugendeyo. After a third song, the group disbanded. These would be the only songs he would release for a long time because he was not ready for the hustle that came with promoting a song.

In 2015 he released another single, "What Should I do?".

Host 
He was co-Mc together with Gloria Kasujja during the launch of NewFem contraceptive by Uganda Health Marketing Group (UHMG) in March 2009

In May 2010, emceed at the 2010 Buzz Teeniez Awards ceremony.

In May 2018, Richard hosted Live Sipping Night at Racer's Bar, Bukoto. In October, he emceed at Kenneth Mugabi's maiden concert, "Strings of my Soul"

Stand-up 
In 2013, Richard performed as part of the acts celebrating Pablo's nine years in the comedy industry.

On 12 July 2019, he hosted his first one-man comedy show dubbed Laugh Conquers All.

Acting 
In 2002, Richard acted several plays at the National Theatre including The Virgin, The Journeys and A Jewel in Every Name.

He joined Theatre Factory in October 2003.

In 2005, he played the role of Daudi in a television series called Hand in Hand, together with Jacqueline Kizza and Veronica Namanda.

He acted in The Last King of Scotland as an assistant of a politician in 2006. later in the same year, he joined  Rock Point radio while at Theatre Factory. In this radio drama, he portrayed the character of Deo, a feat which won him a Voice Actor's Award. He left the radio drama in 2007.

In 2007, Richard, together with Anne Kansiime, Veronica Namanda, Bugingo Hannington and Gerald Rutaro acted in a short movie, What Happened in Room 13.

In January 2010, together with 13 other members of Theatre Factory, Richard left and formed Fun Factory Uganda where he is the Communications Director. In Fun Factory's weekly sketches of Comedicine, his most recurring roles being The arrogant Munyankole, Junior and Phobia the drunkard. He acted in the movie Speak Out which premiered at Theatre La Bonita on 21 January 2010.

In 2011, Richard was part of the cast that formed The Hostel (TV series) where he acted as Twine, one of the lead characters. He left the set in 2012 after disagreement with the management on the professional fees being paid to the actors.

In July 2012, he was part of the cast that acted Silent Voices, The Play which was based on interviews with victims of the Northern Uganda Conflict.

Richard acted as Dez in Queen of Katwe in 2016, alongside David Oyelowo and Lupita Nyong'o. In the same year, he acted as Dj Kadanke in Rain

Richard was among the nine seasoned actors that were signed by the Development Channel to promote activities like African Child Poverty Alleviator Program in June 2018.

Personal life 

Richard is the second born of five siblings born to Enock and Hope Tuwaangye. After she introduced him to her parents officially on 1 August 2015, Richard married Sharon Atwiine Kagarura on Martyr's Day 3 June 2016. They have two children, Kakama and Amanya.

Filmography

Film

Television

Theatre

References 

Ugandan musicians
Ugandan actors
Ugandan comedians
1980 births
Living people